Alfred Henry Gill (3 December 1856 – 27 August 1914) was an English Labour Member of Parliament for Bolton.

He was born in Rochdale, the son of John and Mary (née Stott) Gill, and educated at St. Mary's Elementary School, Balderstone. He started work in a cotton mill at the age of 10, became an active campaigner for workers' rights and rose to be General Secretary of the Bolton Operative Spinners Association, a locally important trade union. He also served as a Justice of the Peace (JP) for Bolton from 1899.

In 1906 he entered Parliament as the junior MP for Bolton, one of the 29 original members of the Parliamentary Labour Party. Their victories in the polls were made possible by a deal with the Liberal Party whereby the Liberals would give up selected seats and support the Labour candidate instead. He subsequently held the seat, latterly as the senior MP, until his death from anaemia. Throughout his time in Parliament he fought for better health and safety in the workplace. At the time of his death he was vice-chairman of the Parliamentary Labour Party.

He died in 1914 and is buried in Heaton Cemetery, Bolton. He had married Sarah Ellen Greenwood in Rochdale and had a son and four daughters.

References

External links 
 

1856 births
1914 deaths
People from Rochdale
UK MPs 1906–1910
UK MPs 1910
UK MPs 1910–1918
Labour Party (UK) MPs for English constituencies
Members of the Parliamentary Committee of the Trades Union Congress
Presidents of the Trades Union Congress
British trade union leaders
English trade unionists
United Textile Factory Workers' Association-sponsored MPs
19th-century British businesspeople